Ilulissat Airport; is a minor international airport serving Ilulissat, Greenland, the entire Disko Bay Region, the North and West Greenland. It is the 59th largest airport in the Nordic countries with 83,000 passengers in 2012 and is the second airport built in Greenland for civilian travel partially funded by the EU (former EC) Structural Funds and Cohesion Fund. It is the third-busiest airport in Greenland, and one of the busiest for international travel in Greenland.

The airport is located north-east of Ilulissat, just  of city centre. It was built in 1983, replacing the heliport. The airport is the main hub out of three used by Air Greenland.

Airport expansion

The purpose of Ilulissat Airport has been debated in Greenland for decades; there has been pressure for runway extension from the local tourist industry and municipal authorities. An expansion considering constructing a new airport in Ilulissat is in progress. The expansion of the airport will feature a  runway to let the airport receive direct international airliner flights from mainland Europe and the Americas. It will be located just north of the present airport  The airport will then (together with Nuuk Airport which will also be expanded) join or even replace Kangerlussuaq Airport as a primary hub, effectively becoming an international gateway to western and northwestern Greenland. There is a general debate on extending or replacing most airports in Greenland, since most are ill located former air bases, or very short.

Airlines and destinations

Air Greenland operates government contract flights to villages in the Disko Bay area. These mostly cargo flights are not featured in the timetable, although they can be pre-booked. Departure times for these flights as specified during booking are by definition approximate, with the settlement service optimized on the fly depending on local demand for a given day. Settlement flights in the Disko Bay and Aasiaat archipelago areas are operated only during winter and spring. During summer and autumn, communication between settlements is by sea only, serviced by Diskoline.

Accidents and incidents
 On 29 January 2014, a De Havilland DHC-8 operated by Air Greenland (Flight 3205) suffered substantial damage in a landing accident. On landing, the left main gear collapsed and the plane skidded down a slope and came to a rest near the perimeter fence. This caused three injuries, not serious, and aircraft scrapped. The cause was a pilot error in difficult wind conditions.

See also
 List of airports in Greenland
 List of the busiest airports in the Nordic countries

References

External links

Airports in Greenland
Airports in the Arctic
Ilulissat
Disko Bay